Brimidius is a genus of longhorn beetles of the subfamily Lamiinae, containing the following species:

 Brimidius annulicornis Breuning, 1954
 Brimidius granulipennis Breuning, 1955
 Brimidius laevicollis (Aurivillius, 1908)

References

Phrissomini